Al Ahly water polo team (often referred to as Al Ahly Pool Club) is one of Al Ahly SC club's sections that represent the club in Egypt and international water polo competitions, the club team section based in Cairo

History 

Ahly water polo team is one of the oldest teams in Egypt and Africa in this competitions and Middle East, Al Ahly the winner of 7 trophies of Arab Water polo championship

Honors

National achievements

Egyptian League :
 Winners ( 11 titles):

Egyptian Cup :
not counted but Al Ahly won the trophy in 2002–03, 2010–11,2011–12 , 2015–16, 2018–19, 2019-20

Regional achievements

Water polo Arab Clubs Championship
 Winners (7 titles) Record :
 1995, 1996, 1998, 2000, 2004, 2005, 2007.

 Runners-up (1 vice champions) : 2002

Technical and managerial staff

TEAM 2006 PLAYERS

Club presidents

See also
 Al Ahly FC
 Al Ahly (volleyball)
 Al Ahly Women's Volleyball
 Al Ahly (basketball)
 Al Ahly Women's Basketball
 Al Ahly (handball)
 Al Ahly Women's Handball
 Al Ahly (table tennis)
 Al Ahly (water polo)
 Port Said Stadium riot
 Al-Ahly TV

References

External links

V
Water polo clubs in Egypt
1955 establishments in Egypt
Sports clubs established in 1955